Annealing may refer to:

 Annealing (biology), in genetics
 Annealing (glass), heating a piece of glass to remove stress
 Annealing (materials science), a heat treatment that alters the microstructure of a material
 Quantum annealing, a method for solving combinatorial optimisation problems and ground states of glassy systems
 Simulated annealing, a numerical optimization technique